The pain à la grecque (literally "Greek bread")  is a typical Brussels pastry consisting of a simple rectangle of milk bread, brown sugar, and cinnamon sprinkled with granulated sugar.

The name does not refer to Greece, but is derived from grecht, a word in the local dialect meaning ditch.

References

Belgian cuisine
Pastries
Culture in Brussels